Carlos Manuel Villalobos Organista (born 1 September 1951) is a Mexican politician affiliated with the National Action Party. As of 2014 he served as Senator of the  LIX Legislature of the Mexican Congress  representing Sonora as replacement of Ramón Corral Ávila.

References

1951 births
Living people
People from Teocaltiche
Politicians from Jalisco
Members of the Senate of the Republic (Mexico)
National Action Party (Mexico) politicians
21st-century Mexican politicians